Galin Bogdanov (born 6 September 1990, Pleven, Bulgaria) is a Bulgarian football defender.

External links
 

Bulgarian footballers
Association football defenders
First Professional Football League (Bulgaria) players
PFC Slavia Sofia players
1990 births
Living people
Sportspeople from Pleven